Heinrich Deubel (19 February 1890 – 2 October 1962) was a German soldier, civil servant, World War I veteran and officer in the Schutzstaffel serving as commandant of Dachau concentration camp.

World War I and Nazi Party membership
Deubel was born in Ortenburg, Kingdom of Bavaria.  The son of a postman, he joined the German Imperial Army and spent 12 years in the service, although he was to spend most of the First World War in a British prisoner of war camp. Right-wing by inclination, Deubel had been involved with the Freikorps and other rightist and anti-Semitic groups from an early age. He became involved with the Nazis in the early 1920s at the same time as Egon Zill and was amongst the first 200 members of the SS. Deubel was a civil servant with the customs office and actually took a leave of absence to join the SS rather than forgo his civil service pension.

Dachau and World War II
Deubel was an inspector at Dachau concentration camp in 1934 when commandant Theodor Eicke was promoted to a role overseeing all concentration camps. Deubel, by then an Oberführer in the SS, was nominated by Eicke as his successor. Deubel commanded the camp from 1 May 1934 until 20 April 1936 with detainees describing his regime as fairly liberal, especially when compared to that of his successor in the role, Hans Loritz.

During his time as commandant, Deubel did fall foul of Heinrich Himmler due to a public incident of violence at a time when the SS was developing a reputation for cruelty in Germany and beyond. On Christmas Eve 1934, Deubel was present at Passau train station when an SS private got into a scuffle with a number of people after delaying the line at a ticket window. When a policeman stepped in to arrest the private, Deubel intervened, threatening to drag a policeman to the camp to be "whipped as he deserved". Deubel would later claim that the incident had happened because he felt it was his duty to defend his fellow SS member as the policeman had forcibly pulled him from the ticket window. However the incident earned Deubel a rebuke from Himmler as it was widely discussed in Germany and even reported in sections of the overseas press.

Aftermath and death
After the Second World War, Deubel was interned until 1948, albeit ultimately no charges were brought against him by the government of West Germany. He died in the Bavarian town of Dingolfing.

Awards and ranks

 Iron Cross First and Second Class

References

1890 births
1962 deaths
People from Passau (district)
People from the Kingdom of Bavaria
German prisoners of war in World War I
World War I prisoners of war held by the United Kingdom
Nazi Party politicians
SS-Oberführer
Dachau concentration camp personnel
20th-century Freikorps personnel
Nazi concentration camp commandants
Military personnel of Bavaria
Recipients of the Iron Cross (1914), 1st class
Kapp Putsch participants
20th-century German civil servants
Nazi Party members
German Army personnel of World War I